Bill Mundy may refer to:

 Bill Mundy (baseball) (1889–1958), American baseball player

See also
 William Mundy (disambiguation)
 Mundy (surname)